Dumitru Nadu (born 10 May 1957) is a Romanian former footballer who played mainly as a defender. He ran away illegally from Communist Romania to West Germany, playing for Karlsruher SC and SV Linx in the 1980s.

Honours
Politehnica Timișoara
Cupa României: 1979–80
Karlsruher SC
2. Bundesliga: 1983–84

References

Living people
Romanian footballers
Association football defenders
1957 births
Liga I players
Bundesliga players
2. Bundesliga players
Regionalliga players
FC Drobeta-Turnu Severin players
FC Politehnica Timișoara players
Karlsruher SC players
Romanian expatriate footballers
Expatriate footballers in West Germany
Romanian expatriate sportspeople in West Germany
Romanian defectors
Sportspeople from Timișoara